Aleksandr Alekseyevich Vyazovkin (born 9 April 1997) is a Russian rower. He competed in the 2020 Summer Olympics.

References

1997 births
Living people
Sportspeople from Tolyatti
Rowers at the 2020 Summer Olympics
Russian male rowers
Olympic rowers of Russia